Castrica is a genus of moths in the family Erebidae. The genus was erected by William Schaus in 1896.

Species
Castrica phalaenoides (Drury, 1773)
Castrica sordidior Rothschild, 1909

References

Phaegopterina
Moth genera